Rhodesia, known initially as Zambesia, is a historical region in southern Africa whose formal boundaries evolved between the 1890s and 1980. Demarcated and named by the British South Africa Company (BSAC), which governed it until the 1920s, it thereafter saw administration by various authorities.  It was bisected by a natural border, the Zambezi.  The territory to the north of the Zambezi was officially designated Northern Rhodesia by the company, and has been Zambia since 1964; that to the south, which the company dubbed Southern Rhodesia, became Zimbabwe in 1980. Northern and Southern Rhodesia were sometimes informally called "the Rhodesias".

The term "Rhodesia" was first used to refer to the region by White settlers in the 1890s who informally named their new home after Cecil Rhodes, the company's founder and managing director. It was used in newspapers from 1891 and was made official by the company in 1895.

To confuse matters, Southern Rhodesia, which became a self-governing colony of the United Kingdom in 1923, referred to itself simply as "Rhodesia" from 1964 to 1979, and in 1965 unilaterally declared independence under that name. It thereafter briefly renamed itself "Zimbabwe Rhodesia" in 1979.

The usage of the term Rhodesia to refer to the historical region fell from prominence after Northern Rhodesia became Zambia in 1964. From then until 1980, "Rhodesia" commonly referred to Southern Rhodesia alone. Since 1980 the term has not been in general use, aside from in a historical context.

Etymology 
When whites settled what became "Southern Rhodesia" in 1890, and when the British South Africa Company was chartered to administer "North-Western Rhodesia" and "North-Eastern Rhodesia", it was not under those names, but the names of the parts—"Mashonaland", "Matabeleland", "Barotseland", and so on. The territories were initially collectively referred to as "Zambesia" (Cecil Rhodes's preferred name), "Charterland" (Leander Starr Jameson's proposal) or "the BSAC territories". "Rhodesia" was used informally by the settlers from the start of white settlement, and was common enough usage for newspapers to start using it in articles in 1891. In 1892 it was used for the name of the first newspaper in Salisbury, The Rhodesia Herald. The BSAC officially adopted the name "Rhodesia" in May 1895, and the British government followed in 1898. "It is not clear why the name should have been pronounced with the emphasis on the second rather than the first syllable," Robert Blake comments, "but this appears to have been the custom from the beginning and it never changed."

The first official use of "Rhodesia" was actually for a boma on Lake Mweru, established in 1892 near the mouth of the Kalungwishi River under the authority of Alfred Sharpe, the British Commissioner of the British Central Africa protectorate in Nyasaland. After "Rhodesia" became the official name of the territories in 1895, the boma's name was changed to "Kalungwishi". It was closed some years later.

Although "Northern Rhodesia" was not an official name until 1911 when Barotziland-North-Western Rhodesia and North-Eastern Rhodesia were combined, the name was used informally from 1895 onwards when referring to those two territories collectively.

History

Present-day Zambia

 North-Western Rhodesia—British South Africa Company (BSAC) administered—1890;
 North-Western Rhodesia and North-Eastern Rhodesia—Protectorates—1893;
 North-Eastern Rhodesia—BSAC administered—1897;
 Barotziland-North-Western Rhodesia and North-Eastern Rhodesia—Amalgamated but administered separately—1899–1911;

 Northern Rhodesia—Protectorate under BSAC —1911–1924;
 Northern Rhodesia—British protectorate—1924–1953;
 Federation of Rhodesia and Nyasaland—Territory of Northern Rhodesia—1953–1964;
 Zambia—Independence granted—1964 onwards.

Present-day Zimbabwe

 Mashonaland and Matabeleland—BSAC protectorates—1888–1894;
 South Zambezia—Mashonaland and Matabeleland combined—1894–1895;
 Rhodesia—Protectorate combined with North Zambezia—1895–1901;
 Southern Rhodesia—South Zambezia separated from Northern Rhodesia—1901–1923;
 Southern Rhodesia—BSAC charter ends; British colony, with self-rule—1923–1953;
 Federation of Rhodesia and Nyasaland—Territory of Southern Rhodesia, retaining self-rule—1953–1963;
 Southern Rhodesia—Federation dissolved; British colony, retaining self-rule—1964–1965;
 Rhodesia—Unilateral Declaration of Independence, unrecognised state—1965–1979 (self-declared republic from 1970);
 Zimbabwe Rhodesia—Internal Settlement government, also unrecognised—1979;
 Southern Rhodesia—Lancaster House Agreement, temporary British colonial rule—1979–1980;
 Zimbabwe—recognised independence granted—1980 onwards.

Public holidays

Public holidays observed in Rhodesia were largely based around milestones in the region's short history. Annual holidays marked various aspects of the arrival of white people to the region during the 1880s and 1890s, as well as the respective unilateral declarations of independence (1965) and of republican government (1970). On these days, most businesses and non-essential services closed. A number of Christian holidays were also observed according to custom, in the traditional British manner, and referred to in official documents by name—Christmas Day, for example, or Easter Monday.

References 

General reference for names and dates of territories
 Zambia Legal Information Institute: Constitutional Development in Northern Rhodesia 1890s–1964

Bibliography

History of Zimbabwe
History of Zambia
Historical regions
Regions of Africa
Cecil Rhodes